Arecio Agapito D'Souza (born 7 September 1949) is an Indian politician and businessperson from Goa. He is a former member of the Goa Legislative Assembly and represented the Cuncolim Assembly constituency from 1994 to 2002.

Early life and education
Arecio Agapito D'Souza was born in Cuncolim, Goa. He completed his M.A.B and is married to Sunita Dsouza. He currently resides at Cuncolim.

Career
In July 1998, D'Souza left United Goans Democratic Party to join Indian National Congress.

Positions held
 Former chairman of the board of Goa State Pollution Control Board (1999–2002)

See also 

 Sardinha ministry

References

External links 
 

1949 births
Living people
Goa MLAs 1994–1999
Goa MLAs 1999–2002
Indian National Congress politicians from Goa
United Goans Democratic Party politicians
People from South Goa district